Sneddon is a surname. Notable people with the surname include:

Alan Sneddon (born 1958), Scottish footballer (Celtic FC, Hibernian FC)
Arthur Sneddon, former New Zealand wrestler
Bob Sneddon (1921–2012), American football running back
David Sneddon (born 1978), Scottish singer, songwriter, musician and music producer
Ian Sneddon (1919–2000), Scottish mathematician
Ian Sneddon (footballer) (born 1946), Scottish footballer (Heart of Midlothian FC)
James Sneddon, Australian linguist
Jamie Sneddon (born 1997), Scottish football goalkeeper (Partick Thistle FC)
 Kevin Sneddon (born 1970), American ice hockey coach
Megan Sneddon (born 1985), Scottish female footballer (Motherwell LFC)
Thomas W. Sneddon Jr. (1941–2014), former district attorney of Santa Barbara County, California

See also
Snedden (disambiguation)
Sneddon's syndrome